

Medalists

Standings
Men's Competition

References
Complete 1987 Mediterranean Games Standings Archived

1987 in water polo
Sports at the 1987 Mediterranean Games
1987
1987